Shabnam Akhtari is a Canadian-Iranian mathematician specializing in number theory, and in particular in Diophantine equations, Thue equations, and the geometry of numbers. She is an associate professor of mathematics at the University of Oregon.

Education and career
Akhtari graduated from the Sharif University of Technology in 2002 with a bachelor's degree in mathematics. She went to the University of British Columbia for graduate study in mathematics, completing her Ph.D. there in 2008. Her dissertation, Thue Equations and Related Topics, was supervised by Mike Bennett.

She was a postdoctoral researcher at Queen's University at Kingston in Canada, the Max Planck Institute for Mathematics in Germany and the Centre de Recherches Mathématiques in Canada before joining the University of Oregon faculty as an assistant professor of mathematics in 2012. She was tenured as an associate professor there in 2018.

Recognition
Akhtari is the 2021–2022 winner of the Ruth I. Michler Memorial Prize of the Association for Women in Mathematics.

References

External links
Home page

Year of birth missing (living people)
Living people
Iranian mathematicians
Iranian women scientists
Women mathematicians
Sharif University of Technology alumni
University of British Columbia alumni
University of Oregon faculty
Number theorists